Rosita Liao Gonzales (April 18, 1929 - August 11, 1994) was a Panamanian educator and folklorist. Born in La Pintada, Panama, she was noted for her research regarding the culture of Coclé Province. For her efforts as an educator, she was awarded the Order of Manuel José Hurtado.

References

External links 
Rosita Liao González - Biblioteca Nacional de Panamá

Panamanian educators
Women folklorists
20th-century Panamanian women
1929 births
1994 deaths